Nasturtium may refer to:

 Tropaeolum, a plant genus in the family Tropaeolaceae, commonly known as nasturtium
 Nasturtium (plant genus), a plant genus in the family Brassicaceae, which includes watercress
 Nasturtiums (E. Phillips Fox) a 1912 painting by E. Phillips Fox
 Nasturtiums, a 1903 painting by Tudor St. George Tucker
 Nasturtium (horse) (1899–1916), an American Champion Thoroughbred racehorse
 Senecio tropaeolifolius, a succulent plant that is known as "false nasturtium"